Gaston Frederick "Country" Lewis (August 4, 1903 – November 28, 1989) was a Negro league baseball player and an American football, basketball, track, and cross country coach.

Biography
A native of Clinton County, Ohio, Lewis grew up on a farm in Caesarscreek Township, Greene County, Ohio, graduated from Wilberforce University, and earned a master's degree at Ohio State University. He played for the Bacharach Giants in 1922 and for the Dayton Marcos in 1926. Lewis served as the head football coach at Alabama State University (1929–1933), Wilberforce University (1934–1946), and Central State University (1947–1956). He also served as the manager of the track and field competition at the 1967 Pan American Games, and was an assistant track and field coach for the 1968 United States Olympic team. Lewis died in Xenia, Ohio in 1989 at age 86.

Head coaching record

Football

References

External links
  and Baseball-Reference Black Baseball Stats and Seamheads
 

1903 births
1989 deaths
Alabama State Hornets football coaches
Central State Marauders athletic directors
Central State Marauders football coaches
Wilberforce Bulldogs baseball players
Wilberforce Bulldogs football coaches
Wilberforce Bulldogs football players
Wilberforce Bulldogs men's basketball players
College men's track and field athletes in the United States
College track and field coaches in the United States
Ohio State University alumni
Bacharach Giants players
Dayton Marcos players
People from Clinton County, Ohio
People from Greene County, Ohio
Players of American football from Ohio
Baseball players from Ohio
Basketball players from Ohio
African-American coaches of American football
African-American players of American football
African-American baseball coaches
African-American baseball players
African-American basketball players
African-American male track and field athletes
20th-century African-American sportspeople
Deaths from cancer in Ohio